Bill of Hare is a 1962 Warner Bros. Merrie Melodies cartoon directed by Robert McKimson. The short was released on June 9, 1962, and stars Bugs Bunny and the Tasmanian Devil.

Plot
The cartoon opens in a seaside town where a crate is being unloaded from a cargo ship, belonging to the Snodgrass Scientific Expedition. The net holding the crate breaks, releasing the Tasmanian Devil. Taz comes on shore and smells food being cooked.  He sees Bugs Bunny under the pier trying to cook a meal in a kettle. Taz throws Bugs into the pot, but Bugs tricks him into switching places. Bugs puts the pot inside a cannon and fires it like a cannonball into the ocean.

Bugs is next seen using a rotisserie to roast carrots over an open fire. Taz ties Bugs to the rotisserie until it is revealed that he is really turning a crank of a truck engine. Taz is run over by the truck and Bugs escapes once again.

Bugs convinces Taz that his only food source is a moose. They go to a train tunnel, which Bugs is passing off as a moose cave. In trying to catch a moose, Taz gets run over twice by trains and once by Bugs, riding a moose.

Taz corners Bugs again but Bugs tricks Taz by assuming a disguise as a waiter in a restaurant and feeding him a skewer with three lit dynamite sticks. The dynamite blows up in Taz's stomach, and Taz chases Bugs, ending with Taz trapped in a cage at the city zoo.

Personnel
Director: Robert McKimson
Producer: David H. DePatie
Story: John Dunn
Animators: Warren Batchelder, Keith Darling, Ted Bonnicksen, George Grandpre'
Layout and background artist: Robert Gribbroek
Editor: Treg Brown
Voices: Mel Blanc
Music: Milt Franklyn

References

External links

1962 films
1962 animated films
1962 short films
Merrie Melodies short films
Warner Bros. Cartoons animated short films
Films directed by Robert McKimson
Films scored by Milt Franklyn
Bugs Bunny films
Tasmanian Devil (Looney Tunes) films
1960s Warner Bros. animated short films
1960s English-language films